Lindsay Davenport was the defending champion, but did not compete this year.

Gala León García won the title by defeating Fabiola Zuluaga 4–6, 6–2, 6–2 in the final. It was the 1st and only title in her career.

Seeds
The first two seeds received a bye into the second round.

Draw

Finals

Top half

Bottom half

References
 Official Results Archive (ITF)
 Official Results Archive (WTA)

Singles